Aaron ben Phinehas was a member of the rabbinical college of Lemberg, and appears in that capacity among the rabbis who had to decide a case in matrimonial law with regard to the marriage of the widow of a man who had been killed by the bands of Chmielnicki. Aaron died at Lemberg, June 20, 1651.

References

17th-century Ukrainian people
Ukrainian Orthodox rabbis
Rabbis from Lviv
1651 deaths
Year of birth missing